Trican Well Service Ltd. is a provider of oilfield services, including acidizing, coiled tubing, fracturing, nitrogen pumping, cementing, microseismic, and industrial services. It is headquartered in Calgary, Alberta, Canada, with operations in Alberta, British Columbia, Manitoba, and Saskatchewan, as well as in the United States.

History
Trican Well Service was founded on April 11, 1979. Until 1997, it primarily operated in the Lloydminster, Alberta area and the Kindersley, Saskatchewan area.

In December 1996, the company became a public company and changed its management.

In January 2013, the company acquired i-TEC Well Solutions.

In 2015, the company sold its Russian operations to Rosneft for $197 million. It also suspended operations in Australia, Algeria, Saudi Arabia, and Colombia to cut costs. In 2016, the company sold its United States hydraulic fracturing  business to Keane Group.

In June 2017, the company acquired Canyon Technical Services.

See also
List of oilfield service companies

References

External links
 

Companies listed on the Toronto Stock Exchange
Oilfield services companies
Engineering companies of Canada
Technology companies of Manitoba